The following is an alphabetical list of topics related to the Republic of Honduras.

0–9
.hn – Internet country code top-level domain for Honduras

A

Adjacent countries:

Elvia Alvarado, activist
Edgar Álvarez, footballer
Oscar Álvarez, politician
Ramón Amaya Amador 1916–1966, writer
Americas
North America
Central America
Islands of Honduras
North Atlantic Ocean
Mar Caribe (Caribbean Sea)
North Pacific Ocean
David Archuleta, American pop singer-songwriter whose mother is from Honduras
Association of Scouts in Honduras
Atlántida (department)
Atlas of Honduras
Atlético Olanchano

B
Bay Islands (department)
Bay Islands, Honduras
Building a Future

C
C.D. Arsenal
C.D. Federal
C.D. Platense
C.D. Victoria
C.D. Vida
Capital of Honduras:  Tegucigalpa
Categories:
:Category:Honduras
:Category:Buildings and structures in Honduras
:Category:Communications in Honduras
:Category:Economy of Honduras
:Category:Education in Honduras
:Category:Environment of Honduras
:Category:Geography of Honduras
:Category:Government of Honduras
:Category:Health in Honduras
:Category:History of Honduras
:Category:Honduran culture
:Category:Honduran people
:Category:Honduras stubs
:Category:Honduras-related lists
:Category:Law of Honduras
:Category:Military of Honduras
:Category:Politics of Honduras
:Category:Society of Honduras
:Category:Sport in Honduras
:Category:Transportation in Honduras
Central America

Cerro Palenque
Chamelecón
Choluteca (department)
Choluteca, Choluteca
Coat of arms of Honduras
Víctor Coello, footballer
Colón (department)
Comayagua
Comayagua (department)
Communications in Honduras
Contra (guerrillas)
Copán
Copán (department)
Cortés (department)
Culture of Honduras

D
Danlí
Demographics of Honduras
Departments of Honduras
Deportes Savio

E
Economy of Honduras
El Paraíso (department)
El Progreso
Elections in Honduras
Electricity sector in Honduras
Empresa Hondureña de Telecomunicaciones
Empresa Nacional de Energia Electrica
Escuela Internacional Sampedrana
Estadio Olímpico Metropolitano

F

America Ferrera, actress
Flag of Honduras
Football War
Foreign relations of Honduras
Francisco Morazán (department)

G
Garifuna music
Garífunas
Geography of Honduras
Gracias
Gracias a Dios (department)
Guanaja
Gulf of Fonseca (Golfo de Fonseca)
Gulf of Honduras (Golfo de Honduras)

H
"Himno Nacional de Honduras"
Hispano FC
History of Honduras
Honduran lempira
Honduras
Honduras Salzburg FC
Honduras under Mexican rule
Hurricane Mitch

I
International Organization for Standardization (ISO)
ISO 3166-1 alpha-2 country code for Honduras: HN
ISO 3166-1 alpha-3 country code for Honduras: HND
ISO 3166-2:HN region codes for Honduras
Intibucá (department)
Intibucá (municipality)
Islands of Honduras
Islas de la Bahía (department)

J
Juticalpa
Juticalpa Tulin

L
La Ruidosa
La Ceiba
La Esperanza, Honduras
La Mosquitia
La Paz (Honduran department)
La Travesía
Lake Yojoa
Latin America
Lempira (department)
LGBT rights in Honduras (Gay rights)
Liberalism in Honduras
Liga de Ascenso Honduras
Liga Nacional de Fútbol de Honduras
Liga Nacional de Fútbol de Honduras 2000-01 Apertura
Liga Nacional de Fútbol de Honduras 2000-01 Clausura
Liga Nacional de Fútbol de Honduras 2001-02 Apertura
Liga Nacional de Fútbol de Honduras 2001-02 Clausura
Liga Nacional de Fútbol de Honduras 2002-03 Apertura
Liga Nacional de Fútbol de Honduras 2002-03 Clausura
Liga Nacional de Fútbol de Honduras 2003-04 Apertura
Liga Nacional de Fútbol de Honduras 2003-04 Clausura
Liga Nacional de Fútbol de Honduras 2004-05 Apertura
Liga Nacional de Fútbol de Honduras 2004-05 Clausura
Liga Nacional de Fútbol de Honduras 2005-06 Apertura
Liga Nacional de Fútbol de Honduras 2005-06 Clausura
Liga Nacional de Fútbol de Honduras 2006-07 Apertura
Liga Nacional de Fútbol de Honduras 2006-07 Clausura
Liga Nacional de Fútbol de Honduras 2007-08 Apertura
Liga Nacional de Fútbol de Honduras 2007-08 Clausura
Liga Nacional de Fútbol de Honduras 2008-09 Apertura
Lists related to Honduras:
Diplomatic missions of Honduras
List of birds of Honduras
List of diplomatic missions in Honduras
List of football clubs in Honduras
List of Hondurans
List of Honduras-related topics
List of islands of Honduras
List of political parties in Honduras
List of rivers of Honduras
List of schools in Honduras
List of universities in Honduras
Topic outline of Honduras
Porfirio "Pepe" Lobo, politician

M
Ricardo Maduro, politician
Mar Caribe
Mara 18 gang
Mara Salvatrucha gang
Óscar Andrés Rodríguez Maradiaga, prelate
Carlos Mencia, comedian
Military of Honduras
Minas de Oro
Salvador Moncada, pharmacologist
Mosquito Coast
Motagua Reservas
Municipal Valencia
Music of Honduras

N
National anthem of Honduras
Aguas Santas Ocaña Navarro, activist
Nueva Ocotepeque
North America

O
Ocotepeque (department)
Olancho (department)
Olimpia Reservas
Omoa

P
Pacific Ocean
Politics of Honduras
President of Honduras
Satcha Pretto, journalist
Puerto Castilla, Honduras
Puerto Cortés
Puerto Lempira

R
Rail transport in Honduras
Carlos Roberto Reina, politician
Republic of Honduras (República de Honduras)
Rivers of Honduras
Roatán
Rocsi, U.S. television personality

S
Sambo Creek
San Pedro Sula
Santa Bárbara (department)
Santa Rosa de Copán
Scouting in Honduras
Siguatepeque, Comayagua
Social Sol
Spanish colonization of the Americas
Spanish language

T
Tegucigalpa – Capital of Honduras
Teguz
Tela
Tocoa
Topic outline of Honduras
Transport in Honduras
Trujillo, Honduras

U
United Nations founding member state 1945
United Provinces of Central America
Universidad NAH
Utila

V
Valle (department)
Virgin of Suyapa

W
Water supply and sanitation in Honduras

Wikipedia:WikiProject Topic outline/Drafts/Topic outline of Honduras
Hype Williams, music video and film director

Y
Yoro (department)

Z
José Zúñiga, actor

See also

 

List of Central America-related topics
List of international rankings
Lists of country-related topics
Topic outline of geography
Topic outline of Honduras
Topic outline of North America
United Nations

References

External links

 
Honduras